Jonathan da Silva Oliveira (born 10 July 1991) is a Portuguese footballer who played as a forward.

References

1991 births
Living people
Sportspeople from Santa Maria da Feira
Portuguese footballers
Association football forwards
Primeira Liga players
Liga Portugal 2 players
C.D. Feirense players
Lusitânia F.C. players
C.D. Trofense players
S.C. Espinho players
A.D. Sanjoanense players
Gondomar S.C. players
C.D. Estarreja players
Anadia F.C. players
C.D. Cinfães players
A.D. Ovarense players